Fred & Farid Group is an independent international boutique network (Advertising firm) with offices  Los Angeles, New York, Shanghai and Paris founded by Fred Raillard and Farid Mokart in 2007. It employs around 300 people.

Fred & Farid also provides investments via Fred & Farid Digital Investment Fund (FFDIF)

Raillard and Mokart had worked as partners beginning in 2000. In 2007 they launched their own independent company.

History
Frederic Raillard and Farid Mokart were both raised in the Paris suburbs, Raillard from a Breton and a Parisian family, Mokart from an Algerian and Kabyle family. After studying respectively design and political science (Sciences Po), Raillard and Mokart started as strategic planner and account manager at Euro RSCG BTC in Paris. They decided to team up and moved to the creative side, working consecutively for 6 major agencies in Paris as creative directors.

Their first project was for start-up Aucland.com, a French online auction site. In 2000, Fred & Farid created the musical video for British Pop Star Robbie Williams "Rock DJ".

FF (formerly Fred & Farid) is an independent creative agency of 100+ people. They produced campaigns for brands like Air France, Audemars Piguet, Audi, Coca-Cola, Diesel, Giorgio Armani, Google, Guerlain, HP, Lacoste, Louis XIII, Martini, Orangina, Porsche, Saint Laurent, Schweppes, Societe Generale, Tmall, Vivo, Wrangler.

Controversy 
In 2011, the Fred & Farid agency was suspected of having bought followers to artificially grow its Twitter account. The group's response to this accusation made the case even more publicized.

The agency was also caught up with deceptive practices on Facebook on behalf of Orangina. In February 2012, an employee of the company had created and used fake Facebook accounts to artificially generate conversations on the Facebook page of Orangina which was a Fred & Farid client. After that the agency stopped this activity having told it in a press release published on its Facebook page on February 22, 2012.

In April 2012, the group threatened to sue the blogger who had updated their purchase of followers a few months earlier. After a wave of protests on social networks, this project was finally abandoned.

References

External links

Advertising agencies of France